James Daniel Niedergeses (February 2, 1917 – November 16, 2007) was an American prelate of the Roman Catholic Church.  He  served as the ninth bishop of the Diocese of Nashville in Tennessee from 1975 to 1992.

Biography
James Niedergeses born on February 2, 1917, in Lawrenceburg, Tennessee. He was ordained to the priesthood for the Diocese of Nashville by Bishop William Adrian on May 20, 1944, in Nashville. Niedergeses spent the 11 years in Chattanooga, Tennessee, the majority of his time there as pastor of Our Lady of Perpetual Help Parish.

On April 8, 1975, Pope Paul VI appointed Niedergeses as bishop of the Diocese of Nashville,  He was consecrated in Rome by Cardinal Giovanni Cicognani on May 20, 1975. 

Pope John Paul II accepted Niedergeses' resignation as bishop of the Diocese of Nashville on October 13, 1992. James Niedergeses died on November 16, 2007 at age 90 at Saint Thomas Hospital in Nashville

References

Episcopal succession

1917 births
2007 deaths
People from Chattanooga, Tennessee
People from Lawrenceburg, Tennessee
Roman Catholic bishops of Nashville
20th-century Roman Catholic bishops in the United States